Protein EVI2B is a protein that in humans is encoded by the EVI2B gene.

References

Further reading